Competitor for  Canada

Frederick Charles Delahaye, sometimes spelled Delahay or Delahey (March 19, 1905 – March 17, 1973), was a Canadian ice hockey player who competed in the 1928 Winter Olympics. In 1928 he was a member of the University of Toronto Grads, the team which won the Olympic gold medal for Canada.

References

External links
Charles Delahay's profile at databaseOlympics

Charles Delahay's profile at Sports Reference.com

1905 births
1973 deaths
Canadian ice hockey players
Ice hockey players at the 1928 Winter Olympics
Olympic gold medalists for Canada
Olympic ice hockey players of Canada
Toronto Varsity Blues ice hockey players
Olympic medalists in ice hockey
Medalists at the 1928 Winter Olympics